The Wood of Suicides is a 2014 debut novel by Australian writer Laura Elizabeth Woollett. It centers on a 17-year-old girl's affair with her English teacher, after her father commits suicide.

Literary References

The Wood of Suicides takes its title from Canto XIII of Dante's Inferno, which describes a tortured wood where suicides are encased in bark. It also borrows heavily from the myth of Apollo and Daphne, referencing it explicitly at several points.

Reception

The Wood of Suicides has received mixed to positive reviews. Kirkus Reviews wrote "an anxious, uneasy, and despondent anti-romance novel." Publishers Weekly wrote "The novel successfully creates a disturbing, ethically ambiguous effect, but the prose, though true to the voice of a lovelorn, troubled teenager, feels overwrought."

References

2014 Australian novels
Psychological novels
Novels set in California
Fiction about suicide
2014 debut novels
Permanent Press (publisher) books